Market and 6th Street (eastbound) and Market and Taylor (westbound) are a pair of one-way light rail stations in San Francisco, California, United States, serving the San Francisco Municipal Railway F Market & Wharves heritage railway line. They are located on Market Street at the intersections of 6th Street and Taylor Street. The low-level platforms are also utilized by several Muni bus and trolleybus routes.

Under the planned Better Market Street project, the F stop would be discontinued to reduce travel times.

References 

San Francisco Municipal Railway streetcar stations